Si me viera don Porfirio ("If Mr. Porfirio Could See Me") is a 1950 Mexican film. It was written by Luis Alcoriza.

Cast

 Sara García	 ...	Doña Martirio
 	 Ángel Garasa		
 	 Domingo Soler		
 	 Eduardo Noriega		
 	 Esperanza Issa		
 	 Silvia Derbez		
 	 Ramón Gay		
 	 Alfredo Varela	 ...	(as Alfredo Varela 'Varelita')
 	 Queta Lavat		
 	 José Pidal		
 	 Dolores Camarillo	 ...	(as Dolores Camarillo 'Fraustita')
 	 Miguel Manzano		
 	 Pepe Nava		
 	 Ramón Sánchez		
 	 Rodolfo Castillo

External links
 

1950 films
1950s Spanish-language films
Mexican comedy films
Mexican black-and-white films
1950 comedy films
1950s Mexican films